Princess Yasmin Aga Khan (born December 28, 1949) is a Swiss-born American philanthropist known for raising public awareness of Alzheimer's disease.

She is the second child of American movie actress and dancer Rita Hayworth, and the third child of Prince Aly Khan, Pakistan's representative to the United Nations from February 1958 until his death in 1960. Her paternal half-brother is Prince Karim al-Husayni, the fourth and current Aga Khan.

Early life 
Yasmin was born at Clinique de Montchoisi in Lausanne, Switzerland, Khan spent her early life with her mother and her maternal half-sister, Rebecca Welles Manning (1944–2004), daughter of Hayworth's marriage to Orson Welles. Her half brothers are His Highness Prince Karim Aga Khan IV and Prince Amyn Aga Khan.

She attended Buxton School, a small boarding school in Williamstown, Massachusetts, and the International School of Geneva. In 1973, she graduated from Bennington College in the United States and was originally interested in opera singing.

Philanthropic activities 
Influenced by the death of her mother, for whom she cared for many years, from Alzheimer's disease, Yasmin Aga Khan serves on the board of directors, as vice chairman, Alzheimer's and Related Disorders Association. She is also the president of Alzheimer's Disease International, a National Council Member of the Salk Institute, and a spokesperson for the Boston University School of Medicine, Board of Visitors. She also serves on numerous boards of the Aga Khan Foundation. The 2009 documentary I Remember Better When I Paint features a stirring interview with Yasmin Aga Khan describing how her mother took up painting while struggling with Alzheimer's and produced beautiful works of art.

Personal life 
She married her first husband, Basil Embiricos, in 1985. The couple had a son, Andrew Ali Aga Khan Embiricos who was born in 1986. The Princess and Embiricos were divorced in 1987. Andrew died in his Chelsea, Manhattan, apartment on December 4, 2011. He was 25.

She married her second husband, Christopher Michael Jeffries, in 1989.

References

External links 
 Alzheimer's Association Official Website

1949 births
Living people
Swiss emigrants to the United States
Bennington College alumni
People from Lausanne
Qajar dynasty
American socialites
Noorani family
Buxton School (Massachusetts) alumni
International School of Geneva alumni
Cansino family
Swiss people of Iranian descent
Swiss people of Pakistani descent
Swiss people of Italian descent
Swiss people of Romani descent
Swiss people of Spanish descent
Swiss people of Irish descent
Swiss people of English descent